Emily Maria Borie Ryerson (August 10, 1863 – December 28, 1939, Philadelphia) was an American first-class passenger who survived the sinking of  on April 15, 1912.

Early life and family

Emily married Arthur Larned Ryerson on January 31, 1889. They had five children: Susan "Suzette" Parker Ryerson (August 3, 1890), Arthur Larned Ryerson, Jr. (1891-1912), Emily Borie Ryerson (October 8, 1893-June 25, 1960), Ellen Ashfordbye Ryerson (1895-1973), and John Borie "Jack" Ryerson (December 16, 1898 - January 21, 1986).

Daughter Emily Borie Ryerson married George Hyde Clarke of Hyde Hall. They, who lived on a large estate near Cooperstown, New York, had seven children before divorcing.

RMS Titanic 
With them were their maid, Victorine Chaudanson, and John's governess, Grace Scott Bowen.

On the afternoon of April 14, 1912, fellow passenger Marian Longstreth Thayer invited Emily for a walk. It was the first time she had been on deck in public. After nearly an hour they settled into deck chairs outside the aft staircase of 'A' deck to watch the sunset.

Emily was awake when the Titanic hit the iceberg on April 14, 1912, 11:40 pm. She woke Arthur, Suzette, Emily, John, Grace, and Victorine.

"[The maid's] door was locked and I had some difficulty in waking her. By this time my husband was fully dressed, and we could hear the noise of feet tramping on the deck overhead. He was quite calm and cheerful and helped me put the lifebelts on the children and on my maid. I was paralyzed with fear of not all getting on deck together in time, as there were seven of us. I would not let my younger daughter, [Emily], dress, but she only put on a fur coat, as I did over her nightgown."

Emily and her family went to 'A' deck and stood there for "fully half an hour". She, Suzette, Emily, Victorine and Grace stepped into Lifeboat 4. John was initially not allowed in, however, Arthur stepped forward and said, "Of course, that boy goes with his mother. He is only 13."

While in the lifeboat, Emily witnessed the ship break in half. Emily, Suzette, Emily, John, Victorine, and Grace survived, but Arthur perished. His body, if recovered, was never identified.

Later life

Emily built the Ryerson mansion at 2700 Lakeview Ave. in Lincoln Park, Chicago.

In the 1920s while traveling through China, Emily met William Forsythe Sherfesee, who was the Forestry Advisor to the Chinese Government and later was appointed Advisor to the Ministry of Finance. He was also a graduate of Yale University and was 18 years her junior. He was the son of Heinrich "Louis" Sherfesee and Annie Griffith Sherfesee.  

The accounts of Forsythe trying to get from Peking to Chicago in the early weeks of December 1927 made the newspapers worldwide.  In the attempt to get him to Chicago during a blizzard, he traveled by boat, train, then finally by private plane, which Emily had sent to bring him to Chicago. He did not arrive on time, and they held the wedding December 9, 1927. They went to Italy and Persia for their honeymoon. They traveled throughout their marriage, and settled in Saint- Jean-Cap-Ferrat on the French Riviera where they built Villa Bontoc. Their next door neighbor was the noted author and playwright, Somerset Maugham.

In December 1939 while in Hawaii, Emily fell and broke her hip but insisted on continuing the trip.  In Uruguay she suffered a fatal heart attack and died on December 28, 1939. She was buried in Lakewood Cemetery in Cooperstown, New York.

References

1863 births
1939 deaths
People from Philadelphia
RMS Titanic survivors
Burials in New York (state)
Female recipients of the Croix de Guerre (France)
Recipients of the Croix de Guerre 1914–1918 (France)